Khalifan (خەلیفان) may refer to:
 Khalifan, Mahabad
 Khalifan, Erbil
 Khalifan, Naqadeh
 Khalifan District, in Mahabad County